Reager is an unincorporated community in Norton County, Kansas, United States.

History
Reager had a post office from 1916 until 1923.

Education
The community is served by Oberlin USD 294 public school district.

References

Further reading

External links
 Norton County maps: Current, Historic, KDOT

Unincorporated communities in Norton County, Kansas
Unincorporated communities in Kansas